The Crusaders or Jerusalem Liberated (Italian:La Gerusalemme liberata) is a 1918 Italian silent historical film directed by Enrico Guazzoni. It is based on the poem Jerusalem Delivered by Torquato Tasso. The film is set during the Crusades and describes Godfrey of Bouillon's conquest of Jerusalem in 1099.

Cast
In alphabetical order
 Olga Benetti 
 Laura Brezet
 Beppo Corradi 
 Edy Darclea 
 Americo De Giorgio 
 Aristide Garbini 
 Alfredo Gelmi 
 Adolfo Geri 
 Mity Mignone 
 Eduardo Monteneve 
 Amleto Novelli 
 Rinaldo Rinaldi 
 Elena Sangro 
 Ljubomir Stanojevic

References

Bibliography 
 Moliterno, Gino. Historical Dictionary of Italian Cinema. Scarecrow Press, 2008.

External links 
 

1918 films
Italian historical drama films
Italian silent feature films
1910s Italian-language films
Films directed by Enrico Guazzoni
1910s historical drama films
Films set in Jerusalem
Crusades films
Films based on poems
Films set in the 11th century
Cultural depictions of Godfrey of Bouillon
Italian black-and-white films
Films about nobility
1918 drama films
Silent historical drama films
Silent war films